The women's 400 metres event at the 2008 World Junior Championships in Athletics was held in Bydgoszcz, Poland, at Zawisza Stadium on 8, 9 and 10 July.

Medalists

Results

Final
10 July

Semifinals
9 July

Semifinal 1

Semifinal 2

Semifinal 3

Heats
8 July

Heat 1

Heat 2

Heat 3

Heat 4

Heat 5

Participation
According to an unofficial count, 39 athletes from 28 countries participated in the event.

References

400 metres
400 metres at the World Athletics U20 Championships
2008 in women's athletics